This is a partial list of unnumbered minor planets for principal provisional designations assigned during 1–15 October 2004. Since this period yielded a high number of provisional discoveries, it is further split into several standalone pages. , a total of 300 bodies remain unnumbered for this period. Objects for this year are listed on the following pages: A–B · C · D–E · F · G–H · J–O · P–Q · Ri · Rii · Riii · S · Ti · Tii · Tiii · Tiv · U–V · W–X and Y. Also see previous and next year.

T 

|- id="2004 TC100" bgcolor=#E9E9E9
| 0 ||  || MBA-M || 17.4 || 1.8 km || multiple || 2004–2021 || 14 Jun 2021 || 84 || align=left | Disc.: Spacewatch || 
|- id="2004 TD100" bgcolor=#d6d6d6
| 0 ||  || MBA-O || 16.79 || 2.4 km || multiple || 2004–2022 || 25 Jan 2022 || 152 || align=left | Disc.: SpacewatchAlt.: 2010 XZ29 || 
|- id="2004 TK100" bgcolor=#E9E9E9
| 0 ||  || MBA-M || 17.37 || 1.9 km || multiple || 2004–2021 || 31 May 2021 || 106 || align=left | Disc.: NEATAlt.: 2018 TC12 || 
|- id="2004 TM100" bgcolor=#E9E9E9
| 0 ||  || MBA-M || 17.29 || 1.9 km || multiple || 2004–2021 || 09 May 2021 || 50 || align=left | Disc.: NEATAdded on 9 March 2021Alt.: 2018 XQ7 || 
|- id="2004 TZ100" bgcolor=#fefefe
| 0 ||  || MBA-I || 17.7 || data-sort-value="0.86" | 860 m || multiple || 1999–2020 || 02 Feb 2020 || 63 || align=left | Disc.: LPL/Spacewatch II || 
|- id="2004 TE101" bgcolor=#fefefe
| 0 ||  || MBA-I || 18.0 || data-sort-value="0.75" | 750 m || multiple || 2003–2019 || 01 Nov 2019 || 75 || align=left | Disc.: LPL/Spacewatch IIAlt.: 2015 PJ305 || 
|- id="2004 TG101" bgcolor=#d6d6d6
| 1 ||  || MBA-O || 17.9 || 1.5 km || multiple || 2004–2019 || 25 Sep 2019 || 46 || align=left | Disc.: LPL/Spacewatch II || 
|- id="2004 TT101" bgcolor=#fefefe
| 0 ||  || MBA-I || 18.57 || data-sort-value="0.57" | 570 m || multiple || 2004–2021 || 04 May 2021 || 72 || align=left | Disc.: Spacewatch || 
|- id="2004 TU101" bgcolor=#E9E9E9
| 0 ||  || MBA-M || 17.32 || 1.4 km || multiple || 1991–2021 || 09 Nov 2021 || 120 || align=left | Disc.: Spacewatch || 
|- id="2004 TN102" bgcolor=#fefefe
| 0 ||  || MBA-I || 18.22 || data-sort-value="0.67" | 670 m || multiple || 2004–2021 || 05 Nov 2021 || 192 || align=left | Disc.: NEAT || 
|- id="2004 TM104" bgcolor=#fefefe
| 1 ||  || MBA-I || 18.28 || data-sort-value="0.66" | 660 m || multiple || 2004–2021 || 08 Jan 2021 || 36 || align=left | Disc.: SpacewatchAdded on 17 June 2021 || 
|- id="2004 TQ104" bgcolor=#fefefe
| 4 ||  || MBA-I || 19.0 || data-sort-value="0.47" | 470 m || multiple || 2004–2019 || 26 Sep 2019 || 21 || align=left | Disc.: Spacewatch || 
|- id="2004 TW104" bgcolor=#E9E9E9
| E ||  || MBA-M || 18.3 || data-sort-value="0.92" | 920 m || single || 6 days || 13 Oct 2004 || 9 || align=left | Disc.: Spacewatch || 
|- id="2004 TZ104" bgcolor=#d6d6d6
| 2 ||  || MBA-O || 17.9 || 1.5 km || multiple || 2002–2019 || 12 Jun 2019 || 39 || align=left | Disc.: SpacewatchAlt.: 2009 QL53 || 
|- id="2004 TD105" bgcolor=#E9E9E9
| 1 ||  || MBA-M || 18.51 || data-sort-value="0.83" | 830 m || multiple || 2004–2021 || 09 Nov 2021 || 37 || align=left | Disc.: SpacewatchAdded on 5 November 2021 || 
|- id="2004 TJ105" bgcolor=#E9E9E9
| 0 ||  || MBA-M || 17.99 || 1.1 km || multiple || 2004–2021 || 11 Sep 2021 || 75 || align=left | Disc.: Spacewatch || 
|- id="2004 TS105" bgcolor=#fefefe
| E ||  || MBA-I || 20.2 || data-sort-value="0.27" | 270 m || single || 6 days || 13 Oct 2004 || 9 || align=left | Disc.: Spacewatch || 
|- id="2004 TY105" bgcolor=#E9E9E9
| 0 ||  || MBA-M || 17.76 || data-sort-value="0.83" | 830 m || multiple || 2004–2021 || 30 Nov 2021 || 95 || align=left | Disc.: LINEARAdded on 22 July 2020 || 
|- id="2004 TK106" bgcolor=#E9E9E9
| 0 ||  || MBA-M || 17.59 || 1.7 km || multiple || 1995–2021 || 31 May 2021 || 55 || align=left | Disc.: LINEAR || 
|- id="2004 TN107" bgcolor=#d6d6d6
| 2 ||  || MBA-O || 17.10 || 2.1 km || multiple || 2004–2021 || 30 Oct 2021 || 34 || align=left | Disc.: SpacewatchAdded on 5 November 2021Alt.: 2021 RL88 || 
|- id="2004 TR107" bgcolor=#fefefe
| 0 ||  || MBA-I || 17.9 || data-sort-value="0.78" | 780 m || multiple || 2003–2020 || 22 Dec 2020 || 65 || align=left | Disc.: Spacewatch || 
|- id="2004 TO108" bgcolor=#fefefe
| 0 ||  || MBA-I || 17.9 || data-sort-value="0.78" | 780 m || multiple || 2002–2019 || 07 Dec 2019 || 109 || align=left | Disc.: LINEAR || 
|- id="2004 TA111" bgcolor=#d6d6d6
| 0 ||  || MBA-O || 16.93 || 2.3 km || multiple || 2004–2021 || 25 Nov 2021 || 77 || align=left | Disc.: SpacewatchAlt.: 2010 WV43 || 
|- id="2004 TE111" bgcolor=#E9E9E9
| 0 ||  || MBA-M || 17.41 || 1.4 km || multiple || 2004–2022 || 24 Jan 2022 || 156 || align=left | Disc.: LINEAR || 
|- id="2004 TG111" bgcolor=#fefefe
| 0 ||  || MBA-I || 18.0 || data-sort-value="0.75" | 750 m || multiple || 2004–2020 || 25 Jan 2020 || 88 || align=left | Disc.: SpacewatchAlt.: 2006 HX35, 2015 XQ66, 2017 HC20 || 
|- id="2004 TX111" bgcolor=#E9E9E9
| E ||  || MBA-M || 18.1 || data-sort-value="0.71" | 710 m || single || 6 days || 13 Oct 2004 || 9 || align=left | Disc.: Spacewatch || 
|- id="2004 TY111" bgcolor=#d6d6d6
| 3 ||  || MBA-O || 17.9 || 1.5 km || multiple || 2004–2018 || 13 Aug 2018 || 22 || align=left | Disc.: Spacewatch || 
|- id="2004 TE112" bgcolor=#d6d6d6
| 2 ||  || MBA-O || 18.0 || 1.4 km || multiple || 2004–2019 || 08 Nov 2019 || 43 || align=left | Disc.: Spacewatch || 
|- id="2004 TJ112" bgcolor=#E9E9E9
| – ||  || MBA-M || 18.3 || data-sort-value="0.65" | 650 m || single || 8 days || 15 Oct 2004 || 10 || align=left | Disc.: Spacewatch || 
|- id="2004 TK112" bgcolor=#FA8072
| 0 ||  || MCA || 17.3 || 1.0 km || multiple || 2004–2020 || 18 Apr 2020 || 431 || align=left | Disc.: NEAT || 
|- id="2004 TF113" bgcolor=#E9E9E9
| 1 ||  || MBA-M || 17.8 || 1.5 km || multiple || 2004–2019 || 07 Jan 2019 || 64 || align=left | Disc.: LPL/Spacewatch IIAlt.: 2015 BK406 || 
|- id="2004 TO113" bgcolor=#d6d6d6
| 0 ||  || MBA-O || 17.5 || 1.8 km || multiple || 2004–2021 || 05 Jan 2021 || 77 || align=left | Disc.: NEATAlt.: 2014 OT18 || 
|- id="2004 TH114" bgcolor=#fefefe
| 0 ||  || MBA-I || 18.9 || data-sort-value="0.49" | 490 m || multiple || 2004–2020 || 15 Feb 2020 || 50 || align=left | Disc.: LPL/Spacewatch II || 
|- id="2004 TJ114" bgcolor=#E9E9E9
| 0 ||  || MBA-M || 18.16 || data-sort-value="0.69" | 690 m || multiple || 2004–2020 || 07 Oct 2020 || 69 || align=left | Disc.: LPL/Spacewatch IIAdded on 19 October 2020Alt.: 2012 SQ42 || 
|- id="2004 TB115" bgcolor=#d6d6d6
| 0 ||  || MBA-O || 16.70 || 2.5 km || multiple || 2004–2021 || 28 Nov 2021 || 100 || align=left | Disc.: Spacewatch || 
|- id="2004 TB118" bgcolor=#fefefe
| 1 ||  || MBA-I || 17.9 || data-sort-value="0.78" | 780 m || multiple || 2004–2021 || 30 Jun 2021 || 42 || align=left | Disc.: LONEOS || 
|- id="2004 TG118" bgcolor=#fefefe
| 0 ||  || MBA-I || 18.4 || data-sort-value="0.62" | 620 m || multiple || 2004–2020 || 12 Dec 2020 || 169 || align=left | Disc.: LONEOS || 
|- id="2004 TU119" bgcolor=#E9E9E9
| 0 ||  || MBA-M || 17.32 || 1.0 km || multiple || 2000–2022 || 07 Jan 2022 || 102 || align=left | Disc.: Oaxaca Obs.Alt.: 2000 WS192, 2012 PP8 || 
|- id="2004 TC120" bgcolor=#E9E9E9
| 0 ||  || MBA-M || 17.87 || 1.1 km || multiple || 2004–2021 || 28 Nov 2021 || 103 || align=left | Disc.: NEAT || 
|- id="2004 TD120" bgcolor=#E9E9E9
| 0 ||  || MBA-M || 17.84 || 1.1 km || multiple || 2004–2021 || 31 Oct 2021 || 160 || align=left | Disc.: NEAT || 
|- id="2004 TH120" bgcolor=#fefefe
| 0 ||  || MBA-I || 18.2 || data-sort-value="0.68" | 680 m || multiple || 2004–2019 || 27 Oct 2019 || 83 || align=left | Disc.: NEAT || 
|- id="2004 TK120" bgcolor=#fefefe
| 0 ||  || MBA-I || 17.89 || data-sort-value="0.79" | 790 m || multiple || 2000–2021 || 09 Apr 2021 || 122 || align=left | Disc.: NEATAlt.: 2015 RU8 || 
|- id="2004 TM120" bgcolor=#E9E9E9
| 1 ||  || MBA-M || 18.01 || 1.1 km || multiple || 2004–2021 || 08 Nov 2021 || 80 || align=left | Disc.: NEATAdded on 30 September 2021 || 
|- id="2004 TE121" bgcolor=#fefefe
| 0 ||  || MBA-I || 18.68 || data-sort-value="0.55" | 550 m || multiple || 2004–2021 || 03 Oct 2021 || 98 || align=left | Disc.: LONEOS || 
|- id="2004 TO121" bgcolor=#E9E9E9
| 0 ||  || MBA-M || 17.83 || 1.1 km || multiple || 2004–2021 || 10 Jul 2021 || 121 || align=left | Disc.: LONEOS || 
|- id="2004 TU121" bgcolor=#fefefe
| 0 ||  || MBA-I || 18.0 || data-sort-value="0.75" | 750 m || multiple || 2004–2021 || 18 Jan 2021 || 76 || align=left | Disc.: LONEOSAlt.: 2008 UP147 || 
|- id="2004 TP125" bgcolor=#d6d6d6
| 0 ||  || MBA-O || 17.20 || 2.0 km || multiple || 2004–2021 || 01 Dec 2021 || 99 || align=left | Disc.: LINEARAlt.: 2015 UW61 || 
|- id="2004 TF126" bgcolor=#fefefe
| 0 ||  || MBA-I || 17.83 || data-sort-value="0.81" | 810 m || multiple || 2002–2021 || 14 May 2021 || 130 || align=left | Disc.: LINEARAlt.: 2014 KD19, 2015 TA247 || 
|- id="2004 TL126" bgcolor=#fefefe
| 0 ||  || MBA-I || 18.00 || data-sort-value="0.75" | 750 m || multiple || 2004–2021 || 30 Jul 2021 || 170 || align=left | Disc.: LINEAR || 
|- id="2004 TV126" bgcolor=#fefefe
| 0 ||  || MBA-I || 18.55 || data-sort-value="0.58" | 580 m || multiple || 2004–2021 || 11 Jun 2021 || 41 || align=left | Disc.: LINEARAlt.: 2018 LE32 || 
|- id="2004 TG127" bgcolor=#E9E9E9
| 0 ||  || MBA-M || 17.42 || data-sort-value="0.98" | 980 m || multiple || 2004–2021 || 15 Nov 2021 || 102 || align=left | Disc.: LINEAR || 
|- id="2004 TM128" bgcolor=#E9E9E9
| – ||  || MBA-M || 18.2 || 1.3 km || single || 27 days || 10 Oct 2004 || 14 || align=left | Disc.: LINEAR || 
|- id="2004 TY128" bgcolor=#E9E9E9
| 0 ||  || MBA-M || 16.5 || 2.8 km || multiple || 1995–2020 || 21 Apr 2020 || 112 || align=left | Disc.: LINEARAlt.: 2015 FT130 || 
|- id="2004 TC129" bgcolor=#fefefe
| 0 ||  || MBA-I || 18.0 || data-sort-value="0.75" | 750 m || multiple || 2004–2021 || 14 Jun 2021 || 72 || align=left | Disc.: LINEARAdded on 17 June 2021Alt.: 2008 YA74, 2011 QJ32, 2014 MC33 || 
|- id="2004 TP130" bgcolor=#E9E9E9
| 0 ||  || MBA-M || 17.57 || 1.3 km || multiple || 2004–2022 || 07 Jan 2022 || 225 || align=left | Disc.: LINEARAlt.: 2008 ON4 || 
|- id="2004 TM132" bgcolor=#fefefe
| 0 ||  || MBA-I || 17.55 || data-sort-value="0.92" | 920 m || multiple || 2004–2021 || 07 Jul 2021 || 82 || align=left | Disc.: NEAT || 
|- id="2004 TS132" bgcolor=#E9E9E9
| 0 ||  || MBA-M || 17.07 || 1.1 km || multiple || 2004–2021 || 27 Dec 2021 || 141 || align=left | Disc.: NEATAlt.: 2010 KR35 || 
|- id="2004 TX132" bgcolor=#E9E9E9
| 0 ||  || MBA-M || 17.48 || 1.3 km || multiple || 2004–2021 || 21 Nov 2021 || 311 || align=left | Disc.: NEAT || 
|- id="2004 TJ134" bgcolor=#d6d6d6
| 0 ||  || MBA-O || 16.92 || 2.5 km || multiple || 2004–2022 || 05 Jan 2022 || 213 || align=left | Disc.: NEAT || 
|- id="2004 TV134" bgcolor=#FA8072
| 0 ||  || MCA || 19.41 || data-sort-value="0.39" | 390 m || multiple || 2004–2021 || 11 Nov 2021 || 103 || align=left | Disc.: LONEOSAlt.: 2014 OL244 || 
|- id="2004 TL135" bgcolor=#E9E9E9
| 0 ||  || MBA-M || 17.4 || 1.8 km || multiple || 2004–2018 || 13 Nov 2018 || 75 || align=left | Disc.: LONEOSAlt.: 2013 RX18 || 
|- id="2004 TT138" bgcolor=#fefefe
| 0 ||  || MBA-I || 17.94 || data-sort-value="0.77" | 770 m || multiple || 2000–2021 || 31 Oct 2021 || 73 || align=left | Disc.: LONEOSAlt.: 2018 VH80 || 
|- id="2004 TK139" bgcolor=#fefefe
| 0 ||  || MBA-I || 18.2 || data-sort-value="0.68" | 680 m || multiple || 1998–2020 || 21 Mar 2020 || 63 || align=left | Disc.: LONEOSAlt.: 2008 YZ105 || 
|- id="2004 TQ139" bgcolor=#E9E9E9
| 2 ||  || MBA-M || 17.9 || 1.5 km || multiple || 2004–2018 || 04 Dec 2018 || 89 || align=left | Disc.: LONEOSAlt.: 2015 BD436 || 
|- id="2004 TX139" bgcolor=#fefefe
| 1 ||  || MBA-I || 18.1 || data-sort-value="0.71" | 710 m || multiple || 2002–2019 || 17 Dec 2019 || 51 || align=left | Disc.: Spacewatch || 
|- id="2004 TC140" bgcolor=#E9E9E9
| 0 ||  || MBA-M || 17.2 || 2.0 km || multiple || 2004–2018 || 18 Oct 2018 || 68 || align=left | Disc.: Spacewatch || 
|- id="2004 TF140" bgcolor=#E9E9E9
| 0 ||  || MBA-M || 18.32 || data-sort-value="0.64" | 640 m || multiple || 2004–2022 || 27 Jan 2022 || 55 || align=left | Disc.: Spacewatch || 
|- id="2004 TQ140" bgcolor=#E9E9E9
| 0 ||  || MBA-M || 18.16 || data-sort-value="0.98" | 980 m || multiple || 2004–2021 || 09 Nov 2021 || 47 || align=left | Disc.: SpacewatchAdded on 5 November 2021 || 
|- id="2004 TS140" bgcolor=#E9E9E9
| 0 ||  || MBA-M || 17.9 || 1.5 km || multiple || 2004–2018 || 02 Nov 2018 || 29 || align=left | Disc.: SpacewatchAdded on 19 October 2020 || 
|- id="2004 TU140" bgcolor=#fefefe
| 0 ||  || MBA-I || 19.0 || data-sort-value="0.47" | 470 m || multiple || 2004–2020 || 13 Sep 2020 || 65 || align=left | Disc.: SpacewatchAlt.: 2014 WT444 || 
|- id="2004 TW140" bgcolor=#d6d6d6
| 0 ||  || MBA-O || 16.8 || 2.4 km || multiple || 2004–2020 || 17 Dec 2020 || 62 || align=left | Disc.: SpacewatchAdded on 9 March 2021 || 
|- id="2004 TJ141" bgcolor=#d6d6d6
| 2 ||  || MBA-O || 17.6 || 1.7 km || multiple || 2004–2021 || 09 Jan 2021 || 39 || align=left | Disc.: SpacewatchAdded on 17 January 2021 || 
|- id="2004 TM141" bgcolor=#d6d6d6
| 0 ||  || MBA-O || 16.66 || 2.6 km || multiple || 2004–2021 || 29 Oct 2021 || 107 || align=left | Disc.: SpacewatchAdded on 19 October 2020Alt.: 2010 OH87 || 
|- id="2004 TN141" bgcolor=#E9E9E9
| 0 ||  || MBA-M || 17.92 || 1.5 km || multiple || 2004–2017 || 23 Sep 2017 || 41 || align=left | Disc.: SpacewatchAdded on 21 August 2021Alt.: 2016 GT224 || 
|- id="2004 TP141" bgcolor=#FA8072
| 2 ||  || MCA || 19.2 || data-sort-value="0.43" | 430 m || multiple || 2004–2021 || 08 Jun 2021 || 81 || align=left | Disc.: Spacewatch || 
|- id="2004 TW141" bgcolor=#fefefe
| 0 ||  || MBA-I || 18.17 || data-sort-value="0.69" | 690 m || multiple || 2004–2021 || 31 May 2021 || 61 || align=left | Disc.: Spacewatch || 
|- id="2004 TF142" bgcolor=#d6d6d6
| 0 ||  || MBA-O || 17.5 || 1.8 km || multiple || 1999–2020 || 07 Dec 2020 || 66 || align=left | Disc.: SpacewatchAlt.: 2015 XB336 || 
|- id="2004 TK142" bgcolor=#fefefe
| 0 ||  || MBA-I || 18.0 || data-sort-value="0.75" | 750 m || multiple || 2004–2020 || 27 Jan 2020 || 65 || align=left | Disc.: Spacewatch || 
|- id="2004 TM142" bgcolor=#fefefe
| 1 ||  || MBA-I || 18.6 || data-sort-value="0.57" | 570 m || multiple || 2004–2020 || 27 Feb 2020 || 39 || align=left | Disc.: SpacewatchAlt.: 2011 SC43 || 
|- id="2004 TW142" bgcolor=#fefefe
| 0 ||  || MBA-I || 19.36 || data-sort-value="0.40" | 400 m || multiple || 2004–2020 || 21 Jul 2020 || 37 || align=left | Disc.: Spacewatch || 
|- id="2004 TN143" bgcolor=#d6d6d6
| 0 ||  || MBA-O || 16.8 || 2.4 km || multiple || 2001–2021 || 05 Jan 2021 || 82 || align=left | Disc.: Spacewatch || 
|- id="2004 TX143" bgcolor=#d6d6d6
| 0 ||  || MBA-O || 17.51 || 1.8 km || multiple || 2004–2021 || 06 Jan 2021 || 51 || align=left | Disc.: SpacewatchAdded on 17 January 2021 || 
|- id="2004 TE144" bgcolor=#fefefe
| 1 ||  || MBA-I || 18.2 || data-sort-value="0.68" | 680 m || multiple || 2004–2019 || 02 Dec 2019 || 57 || align=left | Disc.: Spacewatch || 
|- id="2004 TL145" bgcolor=#E9E9E9
| 0 ||  || MBA-M || 17.84 || 1.1 km || multiple || 2004–2021 || 27 Nov 2021 || 137 || align=left | Disc.: Spacewatch || 
|- id="2004 TN145" bgcolor=#d6d6d6
| 0 ||  || MBA-O || 16.68 || 2.6 km || multiple || 2004–2021 || 07 Nov 2021 || 113 || align=left | Disc.: Spacewatch || 
|- id="2004 TO145" bgcolor=#E9E9E9
| 0 ||  || MBA-M || 17.8 || 1.5 km || multiple || 2004–2021 || 08 May 2021 || 41 || align=left | Disc.: Spacewatch || 
|- id="2004 TO146" bgcolor=#d6d6d6
| 0 ||  || MBA-O || 17.5 || 1.8 km || multiple || 2004–2020 || 08 Dec 2020 || 62 || align=left | Disc.: SpacewatchAlt.: 2014 QY67 || 
|- id="2004 TS146" bgcolor=#E9E9E9
| 3 ||  || MBA-M || 18.4 || 1.2 km || multiple || 2003–2017 || 27 May 2017 || 21 || align=left | Disc.: Spacewatch || 
|- id="2004 TV146" bgcolor=#E9E9E9
| 0 ||  || MBA-M || 18.16 || data-sort-value="0.69" | 690 m || multiple || 2004–2022 || 24 Jan 2022 || 48 || align=left | Disc.: Spacewatch || 
|- id="2004 TA147" bgcolor=#fefefe
| 0 ||  || MBA-I || 18.3 || data-sort-value="0.65" | 650 m || multiple || 2004–2021 || 12 Sep 2021 || 62 || align=left | Disc.: Spacewatch || 
|- id="2004 TB147" bgcolor=#d6d6d6
| 0 ||  || MBA-O || 16.9 || 2.3 km || multiple || 2004–2020 || 11 Dec 2020 || 60 || align=left | Disc.: Spacewatch || 
|- id="2004 TE147" bgcolor=#E9E9E9
| 0 ||  || MBA-M || 17.51 || 1.8 km || multiple || 2004–2021 || 03 May 2021 || 88 || align=left | Disc.: SpacewatchAlt.: 2009 VK93, 2016 EM133 || 
|- id="2004 TO147" bgcolor=#d6d6d6
| 0 ||  || MBA-O || 17.48 || 1.8 km || multiple || 2004–2021 || 02 Dec 2021 || 50 || align=left | Disc.: SpacewatchAlt.: 2015 TQ52 || 
|- id="2004 TU147" bgcolor=#fefefe
| 0 ||  || MBA-I || 17.9 || data-sort-value="0.78" | 780 m || multiple || 2004–2019 || 28 Dec 2019 || 113 || align=left | Disc.: SpacewatchAlt.: 2013 AN181 || 
|- id="2004 TV147" bgcolor=#fefefe
| 4 ||  || MBA-I || 19.3 || data-sort-value="0.41" | 410 m || multiple || 2004–2015 || 08 Nov 2015 || 25 || align=left | Disc.: SpacewatchAlt.: 2015 VC77 || 
|- id="2004 TY147" bgcolor=#d6d6d6
| 1 ||  || MBA-O || 17.8 || 1.5 km || multiple || 2004–2019 || 28 Nov 2019 || 89 || align=left | Disc.: SpacewatchAlt.: 2009 SK126 || 
|- id="2004 TB148" bgcolor=#d6d6d6
| 0 ||  || MBA-O || 17.2 || 2.0 km || multiple || 2004–2021 || 25 Nov 2021 || 77 || align=left | Disc.: Spacewatch || 
|- id="2004 TK148" bgcolor=#d6d6d6
| – ||  || MBA-O || 17.7 || 1.6 km || single || 22 days || 15 Oct 2004 || 12 || align=left | Disc.: Spacewatch || 
|- id="2004 TS148" bgcolor=#fefefe
| 2 ||  || MBA-I || 19.5 || data-sort-value="0.37" | 370 m || multiple || 2004–2018 || 05 Oct 2018 || 30 || align=left | Disc.: Spacewatch || 
|- id="2004 TT148" bgcolor=#d6d6d6
| 0 ||  || MBA-O || 16.6 || 2.7 km || multiple || 2004–2020 || 20 Oct 2020 || 110 || align=left | Disc.: Spacewatch || 
|- id="2004 TC149" bgcolor=#fefefe
| 2 ||  || MBA-I || 19.4 || data-sort-value="0.39" | 390 m || multiple || 2004–2019 || 02 Jun 2019 || 29 || align=left | Disc.: SpacewatchAlt.: 2007 TL306 || 
|- id="2004 TJ149" bgcolor=#E9E9E9
| 0 ||  || MBA-M || 18.06 || 1.0 km || multiple || 2004–2021 || 06 Nov 2021 || 58 || align=left | Disc.: Spacewatch || 
|- id="2004 TQ149" bgcolor=#fefefe
| 0 ||  || MBA-I || 18.2 || data-sort-value="0.68" | 680 m || multiple || 2004–2020 || 23 Jul 2020 || 65 || align=left | Disc.: SpacewatchAlt.: 2014 UQ69 || 
|- id="2004 TT149" bgcolor=#fefefe
| 0 ||  || MBA-I || 18.6 || data-sort-value="0.57" | 570 m || multiple || 2000–2019 || 26 Nov 2019 || 52 || align=left | Disc.: Spacewatch || 
|- id="2004 TY149" bgcolor=#d6d6d6
| 1 ||  || MBA-O || 17.2 || 2.0 km || multiple || 1994–2019 || 20 Oct 2019 || 61 || align=left | Disc.: SpacewatchAlt.: 2017 FK116 || 
|- id="2004 TA150" bgcolor=#E9E9E9
| 2 ||  || MBA-M || 18.5 || data-sort-value="0.59" | 590 m || multiple || 2004–2020 || 14 Aug 2020 || 40 || align=left | Disc.: SpacewatchAlt.: 2008 RC117 || 
|- id="2004 TE150" bgcolor=#E9E9E9
| 0 ||  || MBA-M || 17.5 || 1.8 km || multiple || 2004–2020 || 02 Apr 2020 || 41 || align=left | Disc.: SpacewatchAdded on 22 July 2020 || 
|- id="2004 TF150" bgcolor=#E9E9E9
| 2 ||  || MBA-M || 18.5 || 1.1 km || multiple || 2004-2022 || 22 Sep 2022 || 26 || align=left | Disc.: Spacewatch || 
|- id="2004 TL150" bgcolor=#E9E9E9
| 2 ||  || MBA-M || 18.5 || data-sort-value="0.59" | 590 m || multiple || 2004–2020 || 11 Oct 2020 || 162 || align=left | Disc.: Spacewatch || 
|- id="2004 TS150" bgcolor=#d6d6d6
| 0 ||  || MBA-O || 16.3 || 3.1 km || multiple || 2004–2020 || 15 Feb 2020 || 69 || align=left | Disc.: Spacewatch || 
|- id="2004 TW150" bgcolor=#fefefe
| 2 ||  || MBA-I || 19.3 || data-sort-value="0.41" | 410 m || multiple || 2004–2018 || 10 Nov 2018 || 36 || align=left | Disc.: Spacewatch || 
|- id="2004 TL151" bgcolor=#fefefe
| 0 ||  || MBA-I || 18.6 || data-sort-value="0.57" | 570 m || multiple || 2004–2020 || 16 Nov 2020 || 125 || align=left | Disc.: Spacewatch || 
|- id="2004 TN151" bgcolor=#d6d6d6
| 0 ||  || MBA-O || 16.81 || 2.4 km || multiple || 2004–2021 || 07 Nov 2021 || 66 || align=left | Disc.: Spacewatch || 
|- id="2004 TQ151" bgcolor=#d6d6d6
| – ||  || MBA-O || 18.0 || 1.4 km || single || 8 days || 14 Oct 2004 || 9 || align=left | Disc.: Spacewatch || 
|- id="2004 TT151" bgcolor=#d6d6d6
| 0 ||  || MBA-O || 17.0 || 2.2 km || multiple || 2004–2021 || 05 Jan 2021 || 40 || align=left | Disc.: Spacewatch || 
|- id="2004 TH152" bgcolor=#E9E9E9
| 1 ||  || MBA-M || 18.5 || data-sort-value="0.59" | 590 m || multiple || 2004–2020 || 22 Aug 2020 || 46 || align=left | Disc.: Spacewatch || 
|- id="2004 TJ152" bgcolor=#E9E9E9
| 0 ||  || MBA-M || 18.25 || data-sort-value="0.94" | 940 m || multiple || 2002–2021 || 25 Nov 2021 || 65 || align=left | Disc.: SpacewatchAdded on 9 March 2021 || 
|- id="2004 TM152" bgcolor=#d6d6d6
| 0 ||  || MBA-O || 16.9 || 2.3 km || multiple || 2004–2021 || 15 Jan 2021 || 149 || align=left | Disc.: Spacewatch || 
|- id="2004 TN152" bgcolor=#E9E9E9
| 0 ||  || MBA-M || 17.82 || 1.1 km || multiple || 2004–2021 || 31 Oct 2021 || 64 || align=left | Disc.: Spacewatch || 
|- id="2004 TQ152" bgcolor=#d6d6d6
| 1 ||  || MBA-O || 18.28 || 1.2 km || multiple || 2004–2020 || 19 Nov 2020 || 35 || align=left | Disc.: SpacewatchAdded on 17 January 2021 || 
|- id="2004 TX152" bgcolor=#E9E9E9
| 0 ||  || MBA-M || 17.6 || 1.7 km || multiple || 2004–2020 || 25 Jan 2020 || 55 || align=left | Disc.: SpacewatchAlt.: 2018 VT43 || 
|- id="2004 TY152" bgcolor=#d6d6d6
| 0 ||  || MBA-O || 16.8 || 2.4 km || multiple || 2002–2019 || 01 Nov 2019 || 110 || align=left | Disc.: Spacewatch || 
|- id="2004 TZ152" bgcolor=#fefefe
| – ||  || MBA-I || 19.4 || data-sort-value="0.39" | 390 m || single || 9 days || 15 Oct 2004 || 9 || align=left | Disc.: Spacewatch || 
|- id="2004 TE153" bgcolor=#d6d6d6
| – ||  || MBA-O || 17.3 || 1.9 km || single || 9 days || 15 Oct 2004 || 9 || align=left | Disc.: Spacewatch || 
|- id="2004 TJ153" bgcolor=#fefefe
| 0 ||  || MBA-I || 18.6 || data-sort-value="0.57" | 570 m || multiple || 2000–2018 || 14 Jun 2018 || 38 || align=left | Disc.: Spacewatch || 
|- id="2004 TM153" bgcolor=#fefefe
| 1 ||  || MBA-I || 18.6 || data-sort-value="0.57" | 570 m || multiple || 2000–2019 || 03 Jul 2019 || 29 || align=left | Disc.: Spacewatch || 
|- id="2004 TN153" bgcolor=#d6d6d6
| 0 ||  || MBA-O || 17.17 || 2.0 km || multiple || 2004–2022 || 25 Jan 2022 || 77 || align=left | Disc.: SpacewatchAlt.: 2009 SU105, 2015 XS8 || 
|- id="2004 TS153" bgcolor=#E9E9E9
| 0 ||  || MBA-M || 17.83 || 1.1 km || multiple || 2004–2021 || 11 Nov 2021 || 65 || align=left | Disc.: Spacewatch || 
|- id="2004 TY153" bgcolor=#fefefe
| 1 ||  || MBA-I || 19.93 || data-sort-value="0.31" | 310 m || multiple || 2004–2021 || 07 Oct 2021 || 33 || align=left | Disc.: SpacewatchAdded on 30 September 2021 || 
|- id="2004 TZ153" bgcolor=#fefefe
| 2 ||  || MBA-I || 18.6 || data-sort-value="0.57" | 570 m || multiple || 2004–2019 || 22 Aug 2019 || 30 || align=left | Disc.: Spacewatch || 
|- id="2004 TC154" bgcolor=#d6d6d6
| 0 ||  || MBA-O || 16.56 || 2.7 km || multiple || 1998–2021 || 07 Nov 2021 || 145 || align=left | Disc.: SpacewatchAlt.: 2006 AP11, 2015 RG127 || 
|- id="2004 TH154" bgcolor=#d6d6d6
| 0 ||  || MBA-O || 17.33 || 1.9 km || multiple || 2004–2021 || 27 Nov 2021 || 77 || align=left | Disc.: SpacewatchAlt.: 2015 VU46 || 
|- id="2004 TP154" bgcolor=#d6d6d6
| 0 ||  || MBA-O || 17.02 || 2.2 km || multiple || 2004–2021 || 24 Nov 2021 || 71 || align=left | Disc.: Spacewatch || 
|- id="2004 TR154" bgcolor=#d6d6d6
| 0 ||  || MBA-O || 17.2 || 2.0 km || multiple || 2004–2020 || 20 Oct 2020 || 74 || align=left | Disc.: SpacewatchAlt.: 2015 VB52 || 
|- id="2004 TU154" bgcolor=#d6d6d6
| 2 ||  || MBA-O || 18.0 || 1.4 km || multiple || 2004–2015 || 14 Jan 2015 || 26 || align=left | Disc.: SpacewatchAlt.: 2010 CA206 || 
|- id="2004 TA155" bgcolor=#fefefe
| 0 ||  || MBA-I || 18.0 || data-sort-value="0.75" | 750 m || multiple || 2004–2021 || 01 May 2021 || 76 || align=left | Disc.: SpacewatchAlt.: 2011 SE166 || 
|- id="2004 TB155" bgcolor=#fefefe
| 0 ||  || MBA-I || 18.0 || data-sort-value="0.75" | 750 m || multiple || 2000–2021 || 04 Jan 2021 || 81 || align=left | Disc.: SpacewatchAlt.: 2016 WB27 || 
|- id="2004 TC155" bgcolor=#d6d6d6
| 0 ||  || MBA-O || 16.7 || 2.5 km || multiple || 2002–2020 || 24 Oct 2020 || 71 || align=left | Disc.: SpacewatchAlt.: 2007 FF5 || 
|- id="2004 TD155" bgcolor=#E9E9E9
| 0 ||  || MBA-M || 17.68 || 1.2 km || multiple || 2004–2021 || 06 Nov 2021 || 77 || align=left | Disc.: SpacewatchAlt.: 2006 BX196 || 
|- id="2004 TU155" bgcolor=#E9E9E9
| 1 ||  || MBA-M || 18.5 || data-sort-value="0.59" | 590 m || multiple || 2000–2018 || 20 Jan 2018 || 26 || align=left | Disc.: Spacewatch || 
|- id="2004 TB156" bgcolor=#E9E9E9
| – ||  || MBA-M || 18.3 || data-sort-value="0.65" | 650 m || single || 9 days || 15 Oct 2004 || 9 || align=left | Disc.: Spacewatch || 
|- id="2004 TC156" bgcolor=#fefefe
| 0 ||  || MBA-I || 18.0 || data-sort-value="0.75" | 750 m || multiple || 2004–2019 || 19 Dec 2019 || 59 || align=left | Disc.: Spacewatch || 
|- id="2004 TD156" bgcolor=#fefefe
| 0 ||  || MBA-I || 19.1 || data-sort-value="0.45" | 450 m || multiple || 2004–2019 || 28 Nov 2019 || 49 || align=left | Disc.: Spacewatch || 
|- id="2004 TG156" bgcolor=#fefefe
| 0 ||  || MBA-I || 18.3 || data-sort-value="0.65" | 650 m || multiple || 2004–2021 || 14 Apr 2021 || 59 || align=left | Disc.: SpacewatchAlt.: 2004 TE386, 2015 TX217 || 
|- id="2004 TH156" bgcolor=#fefefe
| 0 ||  || MBA-I || 18.7 || data-sort-value="0.54" | 540 m || multiple || 2000–2019 || 22 Oct 2019 || 46 || align=left | Disc.: Cerro TololoAdded on 21 August 2021Alt.: 2000 OY71, 2004 TD386 || 
|- id="2004 TJ156" bgcolor=#d6d6d6
| 1 ||  || MBA-O || 17.21 || 2.0 km || multiple || 2004–2021 || 09 Nov 2021 || 69 || align=left | Disc.: Spacewatch || 
|- id="2004 TM156" bgcolor=#E9E9E9
| 0 ||  || MBA-M || 17.55 || 1.7 km || multiple || 2004–2021 || 04 May 2021 || 39 || align=left | Disc.: SpacewatchAdded on 19 October 2020 || 
|- id="2004 TP156" bgcolor=#d6d6d6
| 2 ||  || MBA-O || 17.3 || 1.9 km || multiple || 2004–2021 || 30 Nov 2021 || 29 || align=left | Disc.: SpacewatchAdded on 24 December 2021 || 
|- id="2004 TT156" bgcolor=#E9E9E9
| 1 ||  || MBA-M || 19.12 || data-sort-value="0.63" | 630 m || multiple || 2004–2021 || 09 Nov 2021 || 53 || align=left | Disc.: Spacewatch || 
|- id="2004 TU156" bgcolor=#E9E9E9
| 0 ||  || MBA-M || 18.13 || data-sort-value="0.99" | 990 m || multiple || 2004–2021 || 09 Dec 2021 || 52 || align=left | Disc.: Spacewatch || 
|- id="2004 TB157" bgcolor=#d6d6d6
| 0 ||  || MBA-O || 16.9 || 2.3 km || multiple || 1999–2020 || 07 Dec 2020 || 110 || align=left | Disc.: SpacewatchAlt.: 2014 RA37 || 
|- id="2004 TM157" bgcolor=#d6d6d6
| 0 ||  || MBA-O || 15.97 || 3.6 km || multiple || 1999–2022 || 27 Jan 2022 || 185 || align=left | Disc.: SpacewatchAlt.: 2009 TF37 || 
|- id="2004 TO157" bgcolor=#d6d6d6
| 0 ||  || MBA-O || 17.39 || 1.9 km || multiple || 2004–2021 || 25 Nov 2021 || 61 || align=left | Disc.: SpacewatchAdded on 19 October 2020 || 
|- id="2004 TP157" bgcolor=#E9E9E9
| 0 ||  || MBA-M || 16.75 || 1.3 km || multiple || 2000–2022 || 07 Jan 2022 || 219 || align=left | Disc.: SpacewatchAlt.: 2010 JH54 || 
|- id="2004 TB158" bgcolor=#E9E9E9
| 0 ||  || MBA-M || 16.8 || 2.4 km || multiple || 1995–2020 || 16 May 2020 || 92 || align=left | Disc.: Spacewatch || 
|- id="2004 TV158" bgcolor=#fefefe
| 0 ||  || MBA-I || 18.72 || data-sort-value="0.54" | 540 m || multiple || 2004–2021 || 30 Oct 2021 || 104 || align=left | Disc.: SpacewatchAlt.: 2011 WX80 || 
|- id="2004 TX158" bgcolor=#fefefe
| 0 ||  || MBA-I || 18.7 || data-sort-value="0.54" | 540 m || multiple || 2003–2019 || 17 Dec 2019 || 31 || align=left | Disc.: Spacewatch || 
|- id="2004 TZ158" bgcolor=#E9E9E9
| 0 ||  || MBA-M || 17.5 || 1.8 km || multiple || 2004–2020 || 16 Mar 2020 || 60 || align=left | Disc.: SpacewatchAlt.: 2011 FB93 || 
|- id="2004 TD159" bgcolor=#fefefe
| 1 ||  || MBA-I || 18.9 || data-sort-value="0.49" | 490 m || multiple || 2004–2015 || 09 Nov 2015 || 34 || align=left | Disc.: SpacewatchAlt.: 2015 TO66 || 
|- id="2004 TK159" bgcolor=#E9E9E9
| 0 ||  || MBA-M || 18.49 || data-sort-value="0.60" | 600 m || multiple || 2004–2021 || 30 Nov 2021 || 38 || align=left | Disc.: Spacewatch || 
|- id="2004 TM159" bgcolor=#fefefe
| 0 ||  || MBA-I || 18.55 || data-sort-value="0.58" | 580 m || multiple || 2004–2021 || 09 Nov 2021 || 139 || align=left | Disc.: Spacewatch || 
|- id="2004 TT159" bgcolor=#d6d6d6
| 0 ||  || MBA-O || 16.8 || 2.4 km || multiple || 2004–2021 || 30 Nov 2021 || 46 || align=left | Disc.: SpacewatchAdded on 29 January 2022 || 
|- id="2004 TU159" bgcolor=#fefefe
| 1 ||  || MBA-I || 17.7 || data-sort-value="0.86" | 860 m || multiple || 2004–2019 || 30 May 2019 || 44 || align=left | Disc.: Spacewatch || 
|- id="2004 TV159" bgcolor=#d6d6d6
| – ||  || MBA-O || 17.8 || 1.5 km || single || 29 days || 04 Nov 2004 || 9 || align=left | Disc.: Spacewatch || 
|- id="2004 TF160" bgcolor=#d6d6d6
| 0 ||  || MBA-O || 17.2 || 2.0 km || multiple || 2004–2019 || 22 Oct 2019 || 50 || align=left | Disc.: SpacewatchAlt.: 2016 AP169 || 
|- id="2004 TF161" bgcolor=#E9E9E9
| 0 ||  || MBA-M || 18.07 || data-sort-value="0.72" | 720 m || multiple || 2004–2022 || 26 Jan 2022 || 137 || align=left | Disc.: SpacewatchAlt.: 2008 TQ139 || 
|- id="2004 TW161" bgcolor=#fefefe
| 0 ||  || MBA-I || 17.95 || data-sort-value="0.76" | 760 m || multiple || 2004–2021 || 15 Apr 2021 || 71 || align=left | Disc.: Spacewatch || 
|- id="2004 TX161" bgcolor=#E9E9E9
| 0 ||  || MBA-M || 16.8 || 2.4 km || multiple || 2002–2020 || 25 Mar 2020 || 88 || align=left | Disc.: Spacewatch || 
|- id="2004 TJ162" bgcolor=#fefefe
| 1 ||  || MBA-I || 18.8 || data-sort-value="0.52" | 520 m || multiple || 2004–2018 || 17 Aug 2018 || 33 || align=left | Disc.: SpacewatchAdded on 17 June 2021Alt.: 2004 VB117 || 
|- id="2004 TW162" bgcolor=#E9E9E9
| 0 ||  || MBA-M || 17.1 || 2.1 km || multiple || 2004–2021 || 08 Jun 2021 || 52 || align=left | Disc.: SpacewatchAlt.: 2016 GY97 || 
|- id="2004 TC163" bgcolor=#fefefe
| 0 ||  || MBA-I || 18.2 || data-sort-value="0.68" | 680 m || multiple || 2002–2019 || 03 Oct 2019 || 45 || align=left | Disc.: SpacewatchAlt.: 2008 WJ133 || 
|- id="2004 TY164" bgcolor=#fefefe
| 0 ||  || MBA-I || 17.7 || data-sort-value="0.86" | 860 m || multiple || 2001–2021 || 15 Jun 2021 || 142 || align=left | Disc.: SpacewatchAlt.: 2008 UP89, 2013 AY94, 2017 FT153 || 
|- id="2004 TB165" bgcolor=#E9E9E9
| 0 ||  || MBA-M || 17.57 || 1.7 km || multiple || 2004–2021 || 03 May 2021 || 70 || align=left | Disc.: SpacewatchAlt.: 2015 BG80 || 
|- id="2004 TC165" bgcolor=#E9E9E9
| 0 ||  || MBA-M || 17.80 || data-sort-value="0.82" | 820 m || multiple || 2004–2022 || 24 Jan 2022 || 50 || align=left | Disc.: Spacewatch || 
|- id="2004 TF165" bgcolor=#d6d6d6
| 0 ||  || MBA-O || 16.7 || 2.5 km || multiple || 2004–2020 || 14 Nov 2020 || 65 || align=left | Disc.: SpacewatchAlt.: 2009 SC106 || 
|- id="2004 TT165" bgcolor=#fefefe
| 0 ||  || MBA-I || 18.4 || data-sort-value="0.62" | 620 m || multiple || 2004–2021 || 08 May 2021 || 46 || align=left | Disc.: Spacewatch || 
|- id="2004 TY165" bgcolor=#fefefe
| 1 ||  || MBA-I || 18.3 || data-sort-value="0.65" | 650 m || multiple || 2000–2019 || 27 Oct 2019 || 62 || align=left | Disc.: SpacewatchAlt.: 2008 UE267 || 
|- id="2004 TA166" bgcolor=#fefefe
| 0 ||  || MBA-I || 18.7 || data-sort-value="0.54" | 540 m || multiple || 2001–2018 || 10 Oct 2018 || 50 || align=left | Disc.: Spacewatch || 
|- id="2004 TF166" bgcolor=#d6d6d6
| 0 ||  || MBA-O || 17.57 || 1.7 km || multiple || 2004–2021 || 26 Nov 2021 || 57 || align=left | Disc.: Spacewatch || 
|- id="2004 TJ166" bgcolor=#d6d6d6
| – ||  || MBA-O || 17.2 || 2.0 km || single || 8 days || 15 Oct 2004 || 8 || align=left | Disc.: Spacewatch || 
|- id="2004 TK166" bgcolor=#E9E9E9
| 1 ||  || MBA-M || 18.2 || 1.3 km || multiple || 2004–2018 || 10 Oct 2018 || 74 || align=left | Disc.: SpacewatchAlt.: 2017 HX56 || 
|- id="2004 TS166" bgcolor=#FFE699
| 5 ||  || Asteroid || 20.4 || data-sort-value="0.46" | 460 m || single || 30 days || 15 Oct 2004 || 12 || align=left | Disc.: SpacewatchMCA at MPC || 
|- id="2004 TX166" bgcolor=#fefefe
| 1 ||  || MBA-I || 19.3 || data-sort-value="0.41" | 410 m || multiple || 2004–2019 || 29 Oct 2019 || 41 || align=left | Disc.: Spacewatch || 
|- id="2004 TD167" bgcolor=#d6d6d6
| 1 ||  || MBA-O || 17.74 || 1.6 km || multiple || 2004–2021 || 27 Nov 2021 || 55 || align=left | Disc.: SpacewatchAlt.: 2015 TV292 || 
|- id="2004 TH167" bgcolor=#E9E9E9
| – ||  || MBA-M || 18.5 || data-sort-value="0.59" | 590 m || single || 8 days || 15 Oct 2004 || 9 || align=left | Disc.: Spacewatch || 
|- id="2004 TP167" bgcolor=#E9E9E9
| 1 ||  || MBA-M || 17.6 || 1.7 km || multiple || 2004–2018 || 15 Sep 2018 || 33 || align=left | Disc.: Spacewatch || 
|- id="2004 TK171" bgcolor=#fefefe
| 0 ||  || MBA-I || 18.17 || data-sort-value="0.69" | 690 m || multiple || 2004–2021 || 10 Apr 2021 || 60 || align=left | Disc.: LINEAR || 
|- id="2004 TO171" bgcolor=#fefefe
| 0 ||  || MBA-I || 18.37 || data-sort-value="0.63" | 630 m || multiple || 2004–2021 || 09 Dec 2021 || 135 || align=left | Disc.: LINEARAlt.: 2014 SB31 || 
|- id="2004 TR174" bgcolor=#fefefe
| 0 ||  || MBA-I || 17.4 || data-sort-value="0.98" | 980 m || multiple || 2000–2021 || 13 Jan 2021 || 95 || align=left | Disc.: LINEAR || 
|- id="2004 TS175" bgcolor=#E9E9E9
| 0 ||  || MBA-M || 17.70 || 1.2 km || multiple || 2004–2022 || 25 Jan 2022 || 169 || align=left | Disc.: LINEAR || 
|- id="2004 TS176" bgcolor=#d6d6d6
| 4 ||  || MBA-O || 18.0 || 1.4 km || multiple || 2004–2015 || 13 Dec 2015 || 15 || align=left | Disc.: LPL/Spacewatch IIAlt.: 2015 XL358 || 
|- id="2004 TT176" bgcolor=#fefefe
| 3 ||  || MBA-I || 19.3 || data-sort-value="0.41" | 410 m || multiple || 1997–2018 || 04 Dec 2018 || 50 || align=left | Disc.: SpacewatchAlt.: 1997 SW16 || 
|- id="2004 TA177" bgcolor=#d6d6d6
| 2 ||  || MBA-O || 17.8 || 1.5 km || multiple || 1993–2021 || 26 Nov 2021 || 28 || align=left | Disc.: LPL/Spacewatch IIAdded on 29 January 2022 || 
|- id="2004 TL177" bgcolor=#d6d6d6
| 0 ||  || MBA-O || 16.9 || 2.3 km || multiple || 2004–2020 || 21 Oct 2020 || 63 || align=left | Disc.: LPL/Spacewatch IIAdded on 19 October 2020Alt.: 2013 HF105 || 
|- id="2004 TP177" bgcolor=#fefefe
| 1 ||  || HUN || 18.4 || data-sort-value="0.62" | 620 m || multiple || 2004–2020 || 17 Nov 2020 || 106 || align=left | Disc.: SpacewatchAlt.: 2012 SM63 || 
|- id="2004 TS177" bgcolor=#E9E9E9
| 0 ||  || MBA-M || 17.34 || 1.4 km || multiple || 1995–2021 || 10 Sep 2021 || 145 || align=left | Disc.: SpacewatchAlt.: 2010 DE21, 2011 FV53, 2015 CK35 || 
|- id="2004 TA178" bgcolor=#E9E9E9
| 1 ||  || MBA-M || 18.3 || data-sort-value="0.65" | 650 m || multiple || 2004–2018 || 11 Feb 2018 || 61 || align=left | Disc.: SpacewatchAlt.: 2008 SO69 || 
|- id="2004 TB178" bgcolor=#E9E9E9
| 1 ||  || MBA-M || 17.4 || 1.4 km || multiple || 2004–2017 || 24 Nov 2017 || 37 || align=left | Disc.: Spacewatch || 
|- id="2004 TC178" bgcolor=#E9E9E9
| 0 ||  || MBA-M || 17.3 || 1.5 km || multiple || 2000–2020 || 16 May 2020 || 106 || align=left | Disc.: SpacewatchAlt.: 2017 PR || 
|- id="2004 TV178" bgcolor=#fefefe
| 0 ||  || MBA-I || 18.68 || data-sort-value="0.55" | 550 m || multiple || 2004–2021 || 10 Apr 2021 || 27 || align=left | Disc.: SpacewatchAdded on 19 October 2020 || 
|- id="2004 TJ179" bgcolor=#fefefe
| 0 ||  || MBA-I || 18.19 || data-sort-value="0.68" | 680 m || multiple || 2004–2021 || 06 Apr 2021 || 92 || align=left | Disc.: SpacewatchAlt.: 2015 RW216 || 
|- id="2004 TU179" bgcolor=#E9E9E9
| 0 ||  || MBA-M || 17.65 || 1.6 km || multiple || 2004–2021 || 31 May 2021 || 56 || align=left | Disc.: Spacewatch || 
|- id="2004 TX179" bgcolor=#fefefe
| 0 ||  || MBA-I || 19.27 || data-sort-value="0.42" | 420 m || multiple || 1994–2021 || 14 Nov 2021 || 90 || align=left | Disc.: SpacewatchAlt.: 2014 QP98 || 
|- id="2004 TE180" bgcolor=#d6d6d6
| 0 ||  || MBA-O || 17.2 || 2.0 km || multiple || 1999–2019 || 01 Nov 2019 || 68 || align=left | Disc.: Spacewatch || 
|- id="2004 TP180" bgcolor=#d6d6d6
| 0 ||  || MBA-O || 17.1 || 2.1 km || multiple || 2004–2020 || 24 Sep 2020 || 69 || align=left | Disc.: Spacewatch || 
|- id="2004 TC181" bgcolor=#d6d6d6
| 0 ||  || MBA-O || 17.6 || 1.7 km || multiple || 2004–2020 || 14 Dec 2020 || 45 || align=left | Disc.: SpacewatchAdded on 22 July 2020 || 
|- id="2004 TK181" bgcolor=#fefefe
| 0 ||  || MBA-I || 18.2 || data-sort-value="0.68" | 680 m || multiple || 2004–2020 || 02 Feb 2020 || 67 || align=left | Disc.: Spacewatch || 
|- id="2004 TN181" bgcolor=#d6d6d6
| – ||  || MBA-O || 16.2 || 3.2 km || single || 35 days || 11 Nov 2004 || 9 || align=left | Disc.: Spacewatch || 
|- id="2004 TS181" bgcolor=#E9E9E9
| 2 ||  || MBA-M || 18.0 || data-sort-value="0.75" | 750 m || multiple || 2004–2018 || 20 Jan 2018 || 28 || align=left | Disc.: Spacewatch || 
|- id="2004 TU181" bgcolor=#fefefe
| 0 ||  || MBA-I || 17.9 || data-sort-value="0.78" | 780 m || multiple || 2004–2019 || 19 Sep 2019 || 46 || align=left | Disc.: SpacewatchAdded on 22 July 2020 || 
|- id="2004 TG182" bgcolor=#d6d6d6
| 0 ||  || MBA-O || 16.89 || 2.3 km || multiple || 2004–2022 || 27 Jan 2022 || 121 || align=left | Disc.: SpacewatchAlt.: 2012 FV22 || 
|- id="2004 TL182" bgcolor=#fefefe
| 0 ||  || MBA-I || 18.3 || data-sort-value="0.65" | 650 m || multiple || 2004–2019 || 27 Oct 2019 || 117 || align=left | Disc.: LPL/Spacewatch IIAlt.: 2008 VV18 || 
|- id="2004 TO182" bgcolor=#E9E9E9
| 0 ||  || MBA-M || 18.02 || data-sort-value="0.74" | 740 m || multiple || 2004–2021 || 27 Dec 2021 || 45 || align=left | Disc.: Spacewatch || 
|- id="2004 TD183" bgcolor=#fefefe
| – ||  || MBA-I || 19.1 || data-sort-value="0.45" | 450 m || single || 34 days || 10 Nov 2004 || 12 || align=left | Disc.: Spacewatch || 
|- id="2004 TN183" bgcolor=#fefefe
| 1 ||  || MBA-I || 19.0 || data-sort-value="0.47" | 470 m || multiple || 2001–2020 || 08 Dec 2020 || 83 || align=left | Disc.: Spacewatch || 
|- id="2004 TR183" bgcolor=#fefefe
| 0 ||  || MBA-I || 19.1 || data-sort-value="0.45" | 450 m || multiple || 2004–2020 || 16 Oct 2020 || 65 || align=left | Disc.: Spacewatch || 
|- id="2004 TW183" bgcolor=#d6d6d6
| 2 ||  || MBA-O || 16.8 || 2.4 km || multiple || 2004–2020 || 27 Apr 2020 || 53 || align=left | Disc.: Spacewatch || 
|- id="2004 TX183" bgcolor=#d6d6d6
| – ||  || MBA-O || 18.1 || 1.3 km || single || 8 days || 15 Oct 2004 || 9 || align=left | Disc.: Spacewatch || 
|- id="2004 TY183" bgcolor=#E9E9E9
| 2 ||  || MBA-M || 18.2 || data-sort-value="0.96" | 960 m || multiple || 2004–2017 || 19 Nov 2017 || 23 || align=left | Disc.: Spacewatch || 
|- id="2004 TE184" bgcolor=#E9E9E9
| 1 ||  || MBA-M || 17.9 || 1.5 km || multiple || 2004–2020 || 27 Apr 2020 || 56 || align=left | Disc.: SpacewatchAdded on 22 July 2020Alt.: 2010 EX19 || 
|- id="2004 TG184" bgcolor=#fefefe
| 3 ||  || MBA-I || 19.2 || data-sort-value="0.43" | 430 m || multiple || 2004–2015 || 02 Nov 2015 || 24 || align=left | Disc.: SpacewatchAlt.: 2015 VW8 || 
|- id="2004 TS184" bgcolor=#fefefe
| 0 ||  || MBA-I || 18.9 || data-sort-value="0.49" | 490 m || multiple || 2001–2020 || 11 Dec 2020 || 74 || align=left | Disc.: SpacewatchAdded on 17 January 2021 || 
|- id="2004 TT184" bgcolor=#d6d6d6
| 0 ||  || MBA-O || 17.3 || 1.9 km || multiple || 2004–2019 || 17 Dec 2019 || 75 || align=left | Disc.: Spacewatch || 
|- id="2004 TV184" bgcolor=#E9E9E9
| 3 ||  || MBA-M || 18.2 || 1.3 km || multiple || 2004–2018 || 18 Oct 2018 || 25 || align=left | Disc.: Spacewatch || 
|- id="2004 TF185" bgcolor=#d6d6d6
| 0 ||  || MBA-O || 17.43 || 1.8 km || multiple || 2004–2022 || 09 Jan 2022 || 44 || align=left | Disc.: Spacewatch || 
|- id="2004 TH185" bgcolor=#d6d6d6
| 2 ||  || MBA-O || 18.5 || 1.1 km || multiple || 2004–2020 || 22 Sep 2020 || 40 || align=left | Disc.: Spacewatch || 
|- id="2004 TM185" bgcolor=#E9E9E9
| 0 ||  || MBA-M || 18.0 || 1.4 km || multiple || 2004–2018 || 06 Oct 2018 || 37 || align=left | Disc.: SpacewatchAlt.: 2009 WU202 || 
|- id="2004 TQ185" bgcolor=#d6d6d6
| 0 ||  || MBA-O || 16.77 || 2.5 km || multiple || 2004–2021 || 30 Oct 2021 || 59 || align=left | Disc.: SpacewatchAdded on 21 August 2021 || 
|- id="2004 TS185" bgcolor=#E9E9E9
| 1 ||  || MBA-M || 17.9 || data-sort-value="0.78" | 780 m || multiple || 2004–2020 || 08 Sep 2020 || 63 || align=left | Disc.: SpacewatchAlt.: 2008 RP58 || 
|- id="2004 TW185" bgcolor=#fefefe
| 0 ||  || MBA-I || 19.41 || data-sort-value="0.39" | 390 m || multiple || 2004–2021 || 30 Nov 2021 || 31 || align=left | Disc.: SpacewatchAdded on 5 November 2021 || 
|- id="2004 TX185" bgcolor=#d6d6d6
| 0 ||  || MBA-O || 17.86 || 1.5 km || multiple || 2004–2021 || 26 Nov 2021 || 56 || align=left | Disc.: SpacewatchAlt.: 2014 HO102, 2015 PO32 || 
|- id="2004 TZ185" bgcolor=#E9E9E9
| 1 ||  || MBA-M || 18.99 || data-sort-value="0.67" | 670 m || multiple || 2004–2021 || 30 Nov 2021 || 82 || align=left | Disc.: Spacewatch || 
|- id="2004 TC186" bgcolor=#E9E9E9
| 0 ||  || MBA-M || 18.95 || data-sort-value="0.68" | 680 m || multiple || 2004–2021 || 30 Nov 2021 || 60 || align=left | Disc.: SpacewatchAlt.: 2014 CY8 || 
|- id="2004 TD186" bgcolor=#E9E9E9
| 4 ||  || MBA-M || 17.8 || 1.5 km || multiple || 2004–2017 || 17 Aug 2017 || 28 || align=left | Disc.: Spacewatch || 
|- id="2004 TN186" bgcolor=#fefefe
| 2 ||  || MBA-I || 19.3 || data-sort-value="0.41" | 410 m || multiple || 2004–2015 || 09 Oct 2015 || 27 || align=left | Disc.: Spacewatch || 
|- id="2004 TQ186" bgcolor=#E9E9E9
| 3 ||  || MBA-M || 19.2 || data-sort-value="0.80" | 800 m || multiple || 2004–2013 || 23 Oct 2013 || 22 || align=left | Disc.: Spacewatch || 
|- id="2004 TS186" bgcolor=#E9E9E9
| 1 ||  || MBA-M || 19.06 || data-sort-value="0.65" | 650 m || multiple || 2004–2021 || 10 Oct 2021 || 42 || align=left | Disc.: SpacewatchAdded on 5 November 2021 || 
|- id="2004 TY186" bgcolor=#E9E9E9
| 0 ||  || MBA-M || 17.70 || 1.6 km || multiple || 2004–2021 || 08 May 2021 || 55 || align=left | Disc.: SpacewatchAlt.: 2009 WA56 || 
|- id="2004 TZ186" bgcolor=#fefefe
| 0 ||  || MBA-I || 18.43 || data-sort-value="0.61" | 610 m || multiple || 2004–2021 || 12 May 2021 || 69 || align=left | Disc.: SpacewatchAdded on 11 May 2021Alt.: 2021 GF25 || 
|- id="2004 TD187" bgcolor=#fefefe
| 0 ||  || MBA-I || 18.20 || data-sort-value="0.68" | 680 m || multiple || 2004–2021 || 15 Apr 2021 || 101 || align=left | Disc.: SpacewatchAlt.: 2015 TT46 || 
|- id="2004 TO187" bgcolor=#fefefe
| 0 ||  || MBA-I || 18.2 || data-sort-value="0.68" | 680 m || multiple || 2004–2020 || 23 Jan 2020 || 54 || align=left | Disc.: Spacewatch || 
|- id="2004 TU187" bgcolor=#d6d6d6
| 0 ||  || MBA-O || 16.7 || 2.5 km || multiple || 2004–2020 || 06 Dec 2020 || 105 || align=left | Disc.: Spacewatch || 
|- id="2004 TV187" bgcolor=#E9E9E9
| 0 ||  || MBA-M || 17.86 || 1.1 km || multiple || 2004–2021 || 09 Nov 2021 || 84 || align=left | Disc.: Spacewatch || 
|- id="2004 TX187" bgcolor=#E9E9E9
| 3 ||  || MBA-M || 18.9 || data-sort-value="0.70" | 700 m || multiple || 2004–2021 || 09 Nov 2021 || 37 || align=left | Disc.: Spacewatch || 
|- id="2004 TZ187" bgcolor=#fefefe
| 0 ||  || MBA-I || 18.7 || data-sort-value="0.54" | 540 m || multiple || 2004–2020 || 15 Dec 2020 || 89 || align=left | Disc.: Spacewatch || 
|- id="2004 TA188" bgcolor=#E9E9E9
| 0 ||  || MBA-M || 17.85 || 1.5 km || multiple || 2004–2021 || 09 May 2021 || 60 || align=left | Disc.: SpacewatchAdded on 22 July 2020 || 
|- id="2004 TC188" bgcolor=#d6d6d6
| 0 ||  || MBA-O || 17.82 || 1.5 km || multiple || 1999–2021 || 08 May 2021 || 58 || align=left | Disc.: SpacewatchAdded on 22 July 2020 || 
|- id="2004 TF188" bgcolor=#E9E9E9
| – ||  || MBA-M || 19.3 || data-sort-value="0.58" | 580 m || single || 8 days || 15 Oct 2004 || 9 || align=left | Disc.: Spacewatch || 
|- id="2004 TG188" bgcolor=#E9E9E9
| 0 ||  || MBA-M || 18.68 || data-sort-value="0.77" | 770 m || multiple || 2004–2021 || 08 Dec 2021 || 48 || align=left | Disc.: Spacewatch || 
|- id="2004 TM188" bgcolor=#E9E9E9
| 0 ||  || MBA-M || 17.90 || 1.1 km || multiple || 2004–2021 || 27 Nov 2021 || 70 || align=left | Disc.: Spacewatch || 
|- id="2004 TP188" bgcolor=#d6d6d6
| 0 ||  || MBA-O || 17.63 || 1.7 km || multiple || 1993–2021 || 09 Dec 2021 || 67 || align=left | Disc.: Spacewatch || 
|- id="2004 TS188" bgcolor=#E9E9E9
| 0 ||  || MBA-M || 17.94 || 1.1 km || multiple || 2004–2021 || 14 Aug 2021 || 59 || align=left | Disc.: Spacewatch || 
|- id="2004 TX188" bgcolor=#fefefe
| 0 ||  || MBA-I || 18.33 || data-sort-value="0.64" | 640 m || multiple || 1993–2021 || 13 Apr 2021 || 84 || align=left | Disc.: Spacewatch || 
|- id="2004 TA189" bgcolor=#E9E9E9
| 0 ||  || MBA-M || 17.12 || 2.1 km || multiple || 2004–2021 || 13 May 2021 || 105 || align=left | Disc.: Spacewatch || 
|- id="2004 TE189" bgcolor=#fefefe
| E ||  || MBA-I || 18.7 || data-sort-value="0.54" | 540 m || single || 6 days || 13 Oct 2004 || 9 || align=left | Disc.: Spacewatch || 
|- id="2004 TF189" bgcolor=#d6d6d6
| 5 ||  || MBA-O || 17.6 || 1.7 km || multiple || 2004–2020 || 22 Nov 2020 || 13 || align=left | Disc.: Spacewatch || 
|- id="2004 TK189" bgcolor=#fefefe
| 2 ||  || MBA-I || 19.2 || data-sort-value="0.43" | 430 m || multiple || 2004–2018 || 20 Jan 2018 || 21 || align=left | Disc.: Spacewatch || 
|- id="2004 TO189" bgcolor=#fefefe
| 2 ||  || MBA-I || 18.8 || data-sort-value="0.52" | 520 m || multiple || 2004–2020 || 29 Feb 2020 || 37 || align=left | Disc.: Spacewatch || 
|- id="2004 TR189" bgcolor=#fefefe
| 0 ||  || MBA-I || 18.2 || data-sort-value="0.68" | 680 m || multiple || 2004–2021 || 11 May 2021 || 89 || align=left | Disc.: SpacewatchAlt.: 2011 SZ197 || 
|- id="2004 TV189" bgcolor=#E9E9E9
| 0 ||  || MBA-M || 17.7 || 1.6 km || multiple || 2004–2020 || 23 Mar 2020 || 38 || align=left | Disc.: SpacewatchAdded on 22 July 2020 || 
|- id="2004 TX189" bgcolor=#E9E9E9
| 0 ||  || MBA-M || 17.9 || data-sort-value="0.78" | 780 m || multiple || 2003–2019 || 04 Feb 2019 || 39 || align=left | Disc.: SpacewatchAdded on 5 November 2021 || 
|- id="2004 TE190" bgcolor=#d6d6d6
| 0 ||  || MBA-O || 16.84 || 2.4 km || multiple || 2004–2021 || 26 Oct 2021 || 71 || align=left | Disc.: Spacewatch || 
|- id="2004 TL190" bgcolor=#d6d6d6
| – ||  || MBA-O || 18.1 || 1.3 km || single || 8 days || 15 Oct 2004 || 9 || align=left | Disc.: Spacewatch || 
|- id="2004 TB191" bgcolor=#d6d6d6
| 0 ||  || MBA-O || 16.39 || 2.9 km || multiple || 1998–2021 || 10 Nov 2021 || 159 || align=left | Disc.: SpacewatchAlt.: 2007 EH188 || 
|- id="2004 TC191" bgcolor=#fefefe
| 0 ||  || MBA-I || 18.3 || data-sort-value="0.65" | 650 m || multiple || 2004–2019 || 03 Dec 2019 || 75 || align=left | Disc.: Spacewatch || 
|- id="2004 TL191" bgcolor=#d6d6d6
| 0 ||  || MBA-O || 16.6 || 2.7 km || multiple || 2004–2020 || 17 Oct 2020 || 101 || align=left | Disc.: SpacewatchAlt.: 2014 NQ20 || 
|- id="2004 TV191" bgcolor=#d6d6d6
| 3 ||  || MBA-O || 17.4 || 1.8 km || multiple || 2004–2020 || 25 Sep 2020 || 30 || align=left | Disc.: SpacewatchAlt.: 2013 EO134 || 
|- id="2004 TX191" bgcolor=#fefefe
| 0 ||  || MBA-I || 18.0 || data-sort-value="0.75" | 750 m || multiple || 2004–2019 || 29 Oct 2019 || 63 || align=left | Disc.: Spacewatch || 
|- id="2004 TZ191" bgcolor=#E9E9E9
| 1 ||  || MBA-M || 18.6 || data-sort-value="0.57" | 570 m || multiple || 2000–2018 || 20 Jan 2018 || 31 || align=left | Disc.: Spacewatch || 
|- id="2004 TE192" bgcolor=#fefefe
| 0 ||  || MBA-I || 18.6 || data-sort-value="0.57" | 570 m || multiple || 2004–2019 || 25 Sep 2019 || 34 || align=left | Disc.: Spacewatch || 
|- id="2004 TF192" bgcolor=#d6d6d6
| 1 ||  || MBA-O || 17.8 || 1.5 km || multiple || 2004–2020 || 17 Dec 2020 || 67 || align=left | Disc.: Spacewatch || 
|- id="2004 TA193" bgcolor=#fefefe
| 0 ||  || MBA-I || 18.78 || data-sort-value="0.52" | 520 m || multiple || 2004–2021 || 31 May 2021 || 49 || align=left | Disc.: SpacewatchAlt.: 2018 NS5 || 
|- id="2004 TF193" bgcolor=#E9E9E9
| – ||  || MBA-M || 18.3 || data-sort-value="0.65" | 650 m || single || 8 days || 15 Oct 2004 || 9 || align=left | Disc.: Spacewatch || 
|- id="2004 TK193" bgcolor=#d6d6d6
| 0 ||  || MBA-O || 16.4 || 2.9 km || multiple || 2004–2020 || 16 Nov 2020 || 88 || align=left | Disc.: Spacewatch || 
|- id="2004 TU193" bgcolor=#E9E9E9
| 0 ||  || MBA-M || 17.72 || data-sort-value="0.85" | 850 m || multiple || 2003–2021 || 09 Dec 2021 || 66 || align=left | Disc.: SpacewatchAlt.: 2012 PX39 || 
|- id="2004 TD194" bgcolor=#d6d6d6
| 0 ||  || MBA-O || 17.08 || 2.1 km || multiple || 2004–2021 || 08 Nov 2021 || 65 || align=left | Disc.: SpacewatchAlt.: 2015 TZ51 || 
|- id="2004 TH194" bgcolor=#E9E9E9
| 0 ||  || MBA-M || 18.02 || data-sort-value="0.74" | 740 m || multiple || 2004–2022 || 06 Jan 2022 || 88 || align=left | Disc.: SpacewatchAlt.: 2008 QE7 || 
|- id="2004 TM194" bgcolor=#d6d6d6
| 0 ||  || MBA-O || 16.12 || 3.3 km || multiple || 2002–2021 || 01 Dec 2021 || 159 || align=left | Disc.: Spacewatch || 
|- id="2004 TS194" bgcolor=#E9E9E9
| 0 ||  || MBA-M || 17.47 || data-sort-value="0.95" | 950 m || multiple || 2003–2021 || 10 Nov 2021 || 46 || align=left | Disc.: SpacewatchAlt.: 2007 HT69, 2015 KN3 || 
|- id="2004 TX194" bgcolor=#E9E9E9
| – ||  || MBA-M || 17.6 || 1.7 km || single || 8 days || 15 Oct 2004 || 9 || align=left | Disc.: Spacewatch || 
|- id="2004 TA195" bgcolor=#d6d6d6
| 1 ||  || MBA-O || 17.63 || 1.7 km || multiple || 2004–2021 || 02 Dec 2021 || 56 || align=left | Disc.: SpacewatchAlt.: 2015 TO280 || 
|- id="2004 TB195" bgcolor=#E9E9E9
| 0 ||  || MBA-M || 17.7 || 1.6 km || multiple || 2004–2018 || 10 Dec 2018 || 56 || align=left | Disc.: Spacewatch || 
|- id="2004 TH195" bgcolor=#d6d6d6
| 0 ||  || MBA-O || 16.3 || 3.1 km || multiple || 2004–2020 || 10 Dec 2020 || 92 || align=left | Disc.: SpacewatchAlt.: 2015 TG101 || 
|- id="2004 TL195" bgcolor=#fefefe
| 2 ||  || MBA-I || 18.5 || data-sort-value="0.59" | 590 m || multiple || 2004–2015 || 12 Nov 2015 || 34 || align=left | Disc.: SpacewatchAdded on 22 July 2020 || 
|- id="2004 TM195" bgcolor=#fefefe
| 0 ||  || MBA-I || 18.28 || data-sort-value="0.66" | 660 m || multiple || 2004–2021 || 07 Nov 2021 || 142 || align=left | Disc.: SpacewatchAlt.: 2014 TA72 || 
|- id="2004 TS195" bgcolor=#E9E9E9
| 0 ||  || MBA-M || 18.22 || data-sort-value="0.67" | 670 m || multiple || 2004–2022 || 25 Jan 2022 || 61 || align=left | Disc.: Spacewatch || 
|- id="2004 TZ195" bgcolor=#d6d6d6
| 0 ||  || MBA-O || 16.22 || 3.2 km || multiple || 2004–2022 || 22 Jan 2022 || 183 || align=left | Disc.: SpacewatchAlt.: 2014 SD68 || 
|- id="2004 TB196" bgcolor=#d6d6d6
| 0 ||  || MBA-O || 17.07 || 2.1 km || multiple || 2004–2022 || 25 Jan 2022 || 100 || align=left | Disc.: Spacewatch || 
|- id="2004 TK197" bgcolor=#d6d6d6
| 0 ||  || MBA-O || 17.8 || 1.5 km || multiple || 2004–2021 || 12 Jan 2021 || 203 || align=left | Disc.: Spacewatch || 
|- id="2004 TN197" bgcolor=#fefefe
| 0 ||  || MBA-I || 18.71 || data-sort-value="0.54" | 540 m || multiple || 2004–2021 || 25 Sep 2021 || 77 || align=left | Disc.: SpacewatchAlt.: 2011 UY50 || 
|- id="2004 TS197" bgcolor=#E9E9E9
| 0 ||  || MBA-M || 18.07 || 1.0 km || multiple || 2004–2021 || 30 Aug 2021 || 33 || align=left | Disc.: SpacewatchAdded on 22 July 2020 || 
|- id="2004 TX197" bgcolor=#d6d6d6
| 0 ||  || MBA-O || 16.62 || 2.6 km || multiple || 2004–2021 || 30 Nov 2021 || 90 || align=left | Disc.: Spacewatch || 
|- id="2004 TA198" bgcolor=#fefefe
| 3 ||  || MBA-I || 18.7 || data-sort-value="0.54" | 540 m || multiple || 2004–2015 || 02 Nov 2015 || 37 || align=left | Disc.: Spacewatch || 
|- id="2004 TJ198" bgcolor=#fefefe
| 0 ||  || MBA-I || 18.2 || data-sort-value="0.68" | 680 m || multiple || 2000–2020 || 22 Mar 2020 || 65 || align=left | Disc.: Spacewatch || 
|- id="2004 TK198" bgcolor=#E9E9E9
| 4 ||  || MBA-M || 18.5 || data-sort-value="0.84" | 840 m || multiple || 2004–2021 || 14 Nov 2021 || 53 || align=left | Disc.: Spacewatch || 
|- id="2004 TL198" bgcolor=#fefefe
| 0 ||  || MBA-I || 18.3 || data-sort-value="0.65" | 650 m || multiple || 2004–2020 || 19 Jan 2020 || 53 || align=left | Disc.: Spacewatch || 
|- id="2004 TZ198" bgcolor=#fefefe
| 0 ||  || HUN || 19.1 || data-sort-value="0.45" | 450 m || multiple || 2004–2019 || 25 Jul 2019 || 63 || align=left | Disc.: SpacewatchAlt.: 2011 GQ19 || 
|- id="2004 TJ199" bgcolor=#d6d6d6
| 0 ||  || MBA-O || 16.47 || 2.8 km || multiple || 2004–2020 || 19 Jan 2020 || 49 || align=left | Disc.: LPL/Spacewatch IIAdded on 22 July 2020 || 
|- id="2004 TS199" bgcolor=#d6d6d6
| 0 ||  || MBA-O || 16.6 || 2.7 km || multiple || 2004–2021 || 03 Jan 2021 || 89 || align=left | Disc.: SpacewatchAlt.: 2017 FT112 || 
|- id="2004 TV199" bgcolor=#E9E9E9
| 0 ||  || MBA-M || 16.78 || 2.5 km || multiple || 1999–2021 || 15 May 2021 || 201 || align=left | Disc.: SpacewatchAlt.: 2009 WP216, 2018 UO9 || 
|}
back to top

References 
 

Lists of unnumbered minor planets